Gabriele Bellodi (born 2 September 2000) is an Italian professional footballer who plays as a defender for Serie C club Olbia, on loan from AC Milan.

Club career
Bellodi is a product of AC Milan youth academy, after graduating he was sent on loan and made his Serie C debut for Olbia on 30 September 2018 in a game against Pro Piacenza.
On 10 July 2019, he joined  Serie B club Crotone on loan until 30 June 2020.
On 3 October 2020, Bellodi joined Serie C club Alessandria on a two-year loan.
On 16 July 2022, Bellodi returned to Serie C club Olbia, on a loan until 30 June 2023.

International career
Bellodi made one substitute appearance for Italy national under-17 football team at the 2017 UEFA European Under-17 Championship.

Personal life
His father Mirko Bellodi played as a goalkeeper, most notably for Mantova.

Career statistics

References

External links
 

2000 births
Sportspeople from Mantua
Living people
Italian footballers
Italy youth international footballers
Association football defenders
A.C. Milan players
Olbia Calcio 1905 players
F.C. Crotone players
U.S. Alessandria Calcio 1912
Serie C players
Serie B players
Mediterranean Games silver medalists for Italy
Mediterranean Games medalists in football
Competitors at the 2018 Mediterranean Games
Footballers from Lombardy